Slobodian (also spelled Slobodyan) is a surname. Notable people with the name include:
Andrea Slobodian, Canadian TV reporter
Iuliia Slobodyan (born 1992), Ukrainian rhythmic gymnast
Michael Peter Slobodian (1959-1975), perpetrator of the Brampton Centennial Secondary School shooting
Oleksandr Slobodian (born 1956), Ukrainian politician
Peter Slobodian (1918-1986), Canadian professional ice hockey player
Petro Slobodyan (1953-2020), Ukrainian football player and coach
Quinn Slobodian (born 1978), Canadian historian